Jahan Pyar Miley is a 1970 Hindi film directed by Lekh Tandon. The film stars Shashi Kapoor and  Hema Malini. The film's music is by Shankar Jaikishan. Sharda won the 1970 Filmfare Best Female Playback Award for the song "Baat Zara Hai Aapas Ki". The reviewer for the Indian Express noted: "The highlights of the film are Shashi Kapoor poking fun at love-making in Hindi films and the film trying to justify the situations for the songs."

Cast
Shashi Kapoor 		
Hema Malini 		
Nadira		
Jeevan 		
Nasir Hussain 		
Helen
Zeb Rehman 		
Kumari Naaz 		
Anjali Kadam
Iftekhar

Soundtrack

References

External links 
 

1970 films
1970s Hindi-language films
Films directed by Lekh Tandon
Films scored by Shankar–Jaikishan